Anthony O'Donnell (born 1949) is a Welsh actor.

Career

In 1982, he was awarded the London Critic's Circle Theatre Award for Most Promising Newcomer in the Stratford Season.

Filmography

References

External links

1948 births
Living people
Welsh male film actors
Welsh male stage actors
Welsh male television actors